Justin Orvel Schmidt (March 23, 1947 – February 18, 2023) was an American entomologist, co-author of Insect Defenses: Adaptive Mechanisms and Strategies of Prey and Predators, author of The Sting of the Wild, and creator of the Schmidt sting pain index. Schmidt studied honey bee nutrition, chemical communication, physiology, ecology and behavior at the Carl Hayden Bee Research Center in Tucson, Arizona, before taking lead and devoting full-time to The Southwestern Biological Institute in 2006. As research director of the Southwest Biological Institute, he studied the chemical and behavioral defenses of ants, wasps, and arachnids.

Schmidt shared a 2015 Ig Nobel Prize in Physiology and Entomology for the development of the Schmidt sting pain Index. His work was highlighted by major media outlets around the world.

Schmidt died in Tucson, Arizona, of complications of Parkinson's disease on February 18, 2023, at the age of 75.

See also
 Apiology
 Schmidt sting pain index

References 

 Conniff, Richard. "The King of Sting", in Outside, v. 21 n. 4 (April 1996), pp. 82–84, 147.
 Conniff, Richard. "Stung: How tiny little insects get us to do exactly as they wish", Discover, June 2003.

External links

1947 births
2023 deaths
American entomologists
Pennsylvania State University alumni